Forest School or Forrest School may refer to:

Educational philosophy
 Forest school (learning style), a learner-centred outdoor learning approach

Religious philosophy
 Thai Forest Tradition, a Theravada school of Buddhism in Thailand
 Sri Lankan Forest Tradition, a Theravada school of Buddhism in Sri Lanka

Australia
 Forrest Primary School, in Forrest, Australian Capital Territory

United Kingdom
 The Forest School, Horsham, in Horsham, West Sussex
 Forest School, Walthamstow, in northeast London
 The Forest School, Winnersh, in Winnersh, Berkshire

United States
 The Forest School at the Yale School of the Environment, a school of forestry
 Forrest School (Chapel Hill, Tennessee), in Chapel Hill, Tennessee

See also
 Forest Institute, an American university offering graduate degrees in psychology